People-first language (PFL), also called person-first language, is a type of linguistic prescription which puts a person before a diagnosis, describing what condition a person "has" rather than asserting what a person "is". It is intended to avoid marginalization or dehumanization (either consciously or subconsciously) when discussing people with a chronic illness or disability. It can be seen as a type of disability etiquette but person-first language can also be more generally applied to any group that would otherwise be defined or mentally categorized by a condition or trait (for example, race, age, or appearance).

Person-first language avoids using labels or adjectives to define someone, using terms such as "a person with diabetes" instead of "a diabetic" or "a person with alcoholism" instead of "an alcoholic". The intention is that a person is seen foremost as a person and only secondly as a person with some trait, which does not inevitably define their essence; it avoids essentializing the condition as their prime identity as a human being. Advocates of person-first language point to the failure to mentally separate the person from the trait as reinforcing a sense that both the trait and the person are inherently bad or inferior, leading to discrimination whilst also implicitly reinforcing a sense of permanency even regarding issues that are likely to be temporary. For example, a person with a substance use disorder has a fair chance of achieving long-term remission—many years in which they are healthy and productive—but calling them a "substance abuser" reinforces an unspoken sense that they are inherently and permanently tainted and casts doubt on maintenance of remission.

Definition
People-first language is a type of linguistic prescription. It aims to avoid perceived and subconscious dehumanization when discussing people with disabilities and is sometimes referred to (for example, by NHS England's style guide) as a type of disability etiquette. People-first language can also be applied to any group that is defined by a condition rather than as a people: for example, "those that are homeless" rather than "the homeless."

Rather than using labels to define individuals with a health issue, it is more appropriate to use terminology that describes individuals as being diagnosed with an illness or disorder. People-first language puts the person before the diagnosis and describes what the person has, not what the person is.

The basic idea is to use a sentence structure that names the person first and the condition second, for example, "people with disabilities" rather than "disabled people" or "disabled," to emphasize that they are people first. Because it is a common practice in English to place an adjective before a noun, the adjective might be replaced with a relative clause, e.g., from "an asthmatic person" to "a person who has asthma."

By using such a sentence structure, the speaker articulates the idea of a disability as a secondary attribute, not a characteristic of a person's identity. (See also: Distancing (psychology).)

History
Recommendations and explanations to use person-first language date back as early as around 1960. In her classic textbook, Beatrice Wright (1960)[3a] began her rationale for avoiding the dangers of terminological short cuts like "disabled person" by citing studies from the field of semantics that "show that language is not merely an instrument for voicing ideas but that it also plays a role in shaping ideas" (p. 7). She concludes her arguments thus: "Since physique does stimulate value judgments, it is particularly important to use expressions insofar as feasible that separate physical attributes from the total person" (p. 8). Another influential rehabilitation psychologist, Carolyn Vash, who also spoke from the perspective of her experience living with quadriplegia from polio, advanced similar arguments for person-first language in an unpublished address in 1959.<ref name="business-week">{{cite journal |title=Letter to the editor |trans-title= |last1= |first1= |last2= |first2= |date=1988 |journal=BusinessWeek |volume= |issue=3059–3062 |pages= |doi= |url=https://books.google.com/books?id=tGA1AAAAMAAJ&q=%22people-first+language%22 |language= |quote=Supportive housing needs of elderly and disabled persons: hearing before the Subcommittee on Housing and Urban Affairs of the Committee on Banking, Housing, and Urban Affairs, United States Senate, One Hundred First Congress, first session on S. 566 ... the National Affordable Housing Act, June 2, 1989, Volumes 22–23: "All references to 'handicapped individuals' in the Act must be changed to 'people with disabilities – We join with many of our fellow advocacy organizations in emphasizing the importance of using 'people first' language throughout the Act. |access-date=2022-08-05}}</ref>

The term people-first language first appeared in 1988 as recommended by advocacy groups in the United States. The usage has been widely adopted by speech-language pathologists and researchers, with "person who stutters" (PWS) replacing "stutterer". It has been used in AIDS activism, appearing in the Denver Principles (1983), which stated in part, "We condemn attempts to label us as 'victims', a term which implies defeat, and we are only occasionally 'patients', a term which implies passivity, helplessness, and dependence upon the care of others. We are 'People With AIDS'."

Use has been recommended in other increasingly common chronic conditions, such as asthma and diabetes. Non-profit organizations, such as the Obesity Action Coalition have expanded advocacy for People-First Language to obesity. , 5 U.S. medical societies had pledged for it, and use it in their communications: the American Society for Metabolic and Bariatric Surgery, The Obesity Society, American Society of Bariatric Physicians, Academy of Nutrition and Dietetics, and the American Academy of Orthopaedic Surgeons.

Competing models
The most common alternative to person-first language is usually called identity-first language. For example, while someone who advocates for person-first language might refer to a client as a "person with autism", that same client may prefer identity-first language, and ask to be called an "autistic person". Others have proposed "person-centered language", which, instead of being a replacement linguistic rule, promotes prioritizing the preferences of those who are being referred to and argues for greater nuance in the language used to describe people and groups of people.

Rationale

The Sapir–Whorf hypothesis is the basis for ideologically motivated linguistic prescriptivism. The hypothesis states that language use significantly shapes perceptions of the world, and forms ideological preconceptions.

In people-first language, preconceptions judged to be negative are thought to arise from placing the name of the condition before the term "person" or "people", such as "white person" or "Jewish people". Proponents of people-first language argue that this places an undue focus on the condition, which distracts from the humanity of the members of the community of people with the condition.

A 2008 experiment researched teenagers' perception of epilepsy with respect to people-first language. Teenagers from a summer camp were divided into two groups. One group was asked questions using the term "people with epilepsy", and the other group was asked using the term "epileptics", with questions including "Do you think that people with epilepsy/epileptics have more difficulties at school?" and "Do you have prejudice toward people with epilepsy/epileptics?" The study showed that the teenagers had higher "stigma perception" on the Stigma Scale of Epilepsy when hearing the phrase "epileptics" as opposed to "people with epilepsy".

Usage guidelines
United States
Some U.S. organizations like the United Spinal Association have published disability etiquette guides, which prescribe people-first language. The 2007 For Dummies guide to etiquette prescribed people-first language.

, the rules of people-first language have become normative in US governmental institutions on the federal (e.g. CDC) and on state levels in the health departments' Developmental Disabilities Councils e.g. Michigan West Virginia Idaho, Missouri Georgia, or Texas.

As of 2007, it has been a requirement in AMA Manual of Style for academic journals. APA style says that both people-first and identity-first language are acceptable, but stresses using the preferred style of the group or individuals involved (if they have one).

United Kingdom
NHS England's style guide calls for the use of identity-first language in most instances (preferring "disabled person" over "person with a disability", but referring to people "with a learning disability"). The UK government also uses the term "disabled people" (or "people with health conditions or impairments" if it is more appropriate for people receiving disability benefits), but deprecates "an epileptic, diabetic, depressive" in favour of "person with epilepsy, diabetes, depression".

 Criticism 
Critics have objected that people-first language is awkward, repetitive and makes for tiresome writing and reading. C. Edwin Vaughan, a sociologist and longtime activist for the blind, argues that since "in common usage positive pronouns usually precede nouns", "the awkwardness of the preferred language focuses on the disability in a new and potentially negative way". According to Vaughan, it only serves to "focus on disability in an ungainly new way" and "calls attention to a person as having some type of 'marred identity in terms of Erving Goffman's theory of identity. In the social model of disability, a person "is" disabled by societal and environmental factors.

In 1993, the National Federation of the Blind in the US adopted a resolution condemning people-first language. The resolution dismissed the notion that "the word 'person' must invariably precede the word 'blind' to emphasize the fact that a blind person is first and foremost a person" as "totally unacceptable and pernicious" and resulting in the exact opposite of its purported aim, since "it is overly defensive, implies shame instead of true equality, and portrays the blind as touchy and belligerent".

In deaf culture, person-first language has long been rejected. Instead, deaf culture uses deaf-first language since being culturally deaf is a source of positive identity and pride. Correct terms to use for this group would be "Deaf person" or "hard of hearing person". The phrase "hearing impaired" is not acceptable to most Deaf or hard of hearing people because it emphasizes what they cannot do.

Autism activist Jim Sinclair rejects person-first language, on the grounds that saying "person with autism" suggests that autism can be separated from the person. Identity-first language is preferred by many autistic people and organizations run by them. Some advocacy groups and organizations such as Autism Speaks, The Arc and Disability Is Natural support using people-first language. Others including the Autistic Self Advocacy Network do not, saying:

 See also 
 Head-directionality parameter, regarding the placement of adjectives before or after nouns
 Political correctness
 Psychological distancing

References

Further reading
 La Forge, Jan. "Preferred language practice in professional rehabilitation journals". The Journal of Rehabilitation'' 57 (1): 49–51.
 Lynn, V. A. (2017). Language and HIV communication. HIV/AIDS (Auckland, NZ), 9, 183.

Etiquette
Sociolinguistics
Linguistic controversies
1988 introductions